La Source is a ballet made on New York City Ballet by its founding balletmaster (and co-founder) George Balanchine. The premiere took place on November 23, 1968, at the New York State Theater, Lincoln Center.

Balanchine's had previously made a pas de deux to music from Léo Delibes' Sylvia in 1950; he expanded this into a divertissement in 1965. The final version uses music from Delibes' ballets La source and Sylvia and choreography from the earlier pas de deux and divertissement.

Original cast
 Violette Verdy
 John Prinz

External links 

 La Source on the website of the Balanchine Trust

1968 ballet premieres
Ballets to the music of Léo Delibes
Ballets by George Balanchine
New York City Ballet repertory